Kongtong Mountains is one of the sacred mountains of Taoism.  It is located in Pingliang City, Gansu Province, People's Republic of China. It is the mythical meeting site between the Yellow Emperor (also known as Huangdi or by his given name 'Xuan Yuan') and Guangchengzi.

See also 
 Kongtong Sect

Landforms of Gansu
Mountains of Gansu
Parks in Gansu